Sir John Eugene St. Luce, KGCN, (born 1940), is an Antiguan politician from the Antigua Labour Party (ALP). He attended the University of London and majored in economics and social sciences. In 1971, he was appointed to the Senate. In 1976, he was elected to the House of Representatives. He was subsequently re-elected until his retirement from active politics in 2004. He held several portfolios in the Cabinet of Antigua and Barbuda: Minister of Agriculture, Home Affairs, Health, Public Works, Public Utilities and Communications and Finance. He lost to Lester Bird when there was a vote for successor of Vere Bird as the chairman of the ALP. 

He was knighted and received Order of Merit in 2017.

References

Living people
1940 births
Antigua and Barbuda Labour Party politicians
Members of the House of Representatives (Antigua and Barbuda)
Finance ministers of Antigua and Barbuda
Government ministers of Antigua and Barbuda
Recipients of the Order of the Nation (Antigua and Barbuda)